Alistair Slowey Graham (born 11 August 1966) is a Scottish former professional footballer who played as a striker.

Career
Raised in the Royston area of Glasgow, Graham began his professional career in 1984 with Clydebank, making three appearances for the Bankies, also playing a game on loan for Stenhousemuir. Graham's move to Albion Rovers in 1987 saw him win the Second Division, playing over 100 matches in a three-year spell. He played a similar number of games with Ayr United after moving in 1990, scoring over thirty league goals in his time there.

In February 1993, Graham's form won him a move to Premier Division side Motherwell, but by the end of the year he had moved on to fellow top tier side Raith Rovers. Graham's time at Raith was rewarding: although relegated in their first season, the Kirkcaldy side won the League Cup a few months later, providing European football for the first time, and were also promoted as First Division winners. Graham played in Raith's European campaign the following season, leaving at the end of the league season to join Falkirk. His time at Brockville was brief and he ended up playing for Partick Thistle and Albion Rovers within the same season.

Short spells at Ayr United, Clyde and Finland's TPV Tampere followed before a longer period of three years with Stirling Albion. Graham saw out his career with a second spell at Clydebank, as well as at Hamilton Academical, Queen's Park and East Stirlingshire.

He later worked as a coach at Albion Rovers and with East Kilbride, as a newspaper match reporter for the Scottish lower leagues, and away from football as a Royal Mail postman.

Honours
Albion Rovers
 Scottish Second Division: 1988–89

Ayr United
Scottish Challenge Cup runner-up: 1990–91, 1991–92

Raith Rovers
 Scottish League Cup: 1994–95
 Scottish First Division: 1994–95

See also
 List of footballers in Scotland by number of league appearances (500+)

References

External links
 
 

1966 births
Living people
Footballers from Glasgow
Scottish footballers
Scottish Football League players
Association football forwards
Clydebank F.C. (1965) players
Stenhousemuir F.C. players
Albion Rovers F.C. players
Tampereen Pallo-Veikot players
Ayr United F.C. players
Motherwell F.C. players
Raith Rovers F.C. players
Falkirk F.C. players
Partick Thistle F.C. players
Clyde F.C. players
Stirling Albion F.C. players
Hamilton Academical F.C. players
Queen's Park F.C. players
East Stirlingshire F.C. players
Scottish expatriate footballers
Scottish expatriate sportspeople in Finland
Expatriate footballers in Finland